Roxane Lee Prettyman (born March 15, 1957) is a Democratic politician from Maryland. Since 2021, she has served in the Maryland House of Delegates, representing district 44A, based in Baltimore.

Early life
Prettyman was born in the Sandtown-Winchester neighborhood of Baltimore. Prior to holding office, she was a paralegal specialist for the Social Security Administration for 39 years before retiring in 2018. She currently serves as the community outreach and engagement director of First Mount Calvary Baptist Church and on other community boards. She has been an active member of the Baltimore City Democratic State Central Committee since 2015.

In the legislature
Prettyman was appointed to the Maryland House of Delegates on August 23, 2021 to fill the vacancy when Keith Haynes resigned from the legislature.  She has been assigned to the Environment and Transportation Committee and 
its Environment Subcommittee. She is also a member of the Local Government and Bi-County Agencies Subcommittee of the Environment and Transportation Committee. She is a member of the Legislative Black Caucus of Maryland.

References and notes

Democratic Party members of the Maryland House of Delegates
1957 births
Living people
21st-century American politicians
African-American state legislators in Maryland
21st-century American women politicians
Women state legislators in Maryland
21st-century African-American women
21st-century African-American politicians
20th-century African-American people
20th-century African-American women